Disco Singh is a 2014 Punjabi comedy film directed by Anurag Singh and starring Diljit Dosanjh and Surveen Chawla. This is the third collaboration between Singh and Dosanjh after the 2012 blockbuster Jatt and Juliet and the 2013 sequel Jatt & Juliet 2. The shooting of Disco Singh began on 19 November 2013 in New Delhi apparently. The film released on 11 April 2014 to excellent box office collections all over Punjab. Despite receiving disastrous reviews from critics, it performed exceptionally well at the box office, breaking several records.

It is loosely based on 2009 Bollywood film Do Knot Disturb which in turn was a remake of the 2006 French film The Valet (French: La Doublure). Disco Singh was remade in Bengali as Haripad Bandwala under the banner of Shree Venkatesh Films starring Ankush Hazra and Nusrat Jahan in the lead roles.

Plot
The story follows a singer named Lattu (Diljit Dosanjh) who is in love with Sweety (Surveen Chawla), a model. When don Bhupinder Singh (Manoj Pahwa) hires Lattu to perform at a wedding which Sweety also attends, a picture of the trio is captured by a spy who was hired by Bhupinder's wife Pammi (Upasna Singh) who suspects he is having an affair. When the news of Bhupinder cheating on his wife with Sweety is published in the newspaper, Bhupinder tells Pammi that Sweety is Lattu's girlfriend as he was also captured in the photo. Bhupinder's henchmen kidnap Lattu and Bhupinder tells him to pretend to be Sweety's boyfriend in order to make his wife's suspicion go away. Whilst pretending, Sweety and Lattu enter a real relationship which soon enrages Bhupinder who decides to take matters into his own hands, leading to a hilarious climax.

Cast

 Diljit Dosanjh as Bandmaster Lattu Singh
 Surveen Chawla as Model Sweety
 Manoj Pahwa as Don Bhupinder Singh   
 Upasna Singh as Pammi
 Prem Chopra as Papaji
 B.N. Sharma as Ikki
 Karamjit Anmol as Baai
 Apoorva Arora as Priya  
 Rana Ranbir as Director
 Chandan Prabhakar as CID officer

Soundtrack

Box office 

According to Box Office India, Disco Singh has been overwhelmingly successful.

PTC Punjabi Film Awards 2015

Disco Singh won six awards at the 5th PTC Punjabi Film Awards in 2015.

References

External links
 

2014 films
2014 comedy films
Indian comedy films
Indian remakes of French films
Films set in Punjab, India
Films scored by Jatinder Shah
Films shot in Punjab, India
Punjabi-language Indian films
2010s Punjabi-language films
Punjabi remakes of Hindi films
Films directed by Anurag Singh
Punjabi films remade in other languages